Jackson Longridge (born 12 April 1995) is a Scottish professional footballer who plays as a left-back for Cove Rangers, on loan from Livingston.

Longridge previously played for Bradford City, Torquay United, Ayr United, Stranraer, Livingston and Dunfermline Athletic.

Career
Longridge made his debut for Ayr United in a First Division match against Dundee, that Ayr won 3–2, winning the 'Man of the Match' award. In the play-off semi-final match, against Airdrie United on 12 May 2012, he was sent off by referee Steven McLean for an over the ball challenge on Ricki Lamie.

On 18 June 2014, he signed for Stranraer. Longridge scored his first senior goal in a 4–2 victory over Forfar Athletic on 10 January 2015. Longridge signed for Livingston in June 2015. He helped them win successive promotions in 2016–17 and 2017–18.

In June 2018, Longridge signed for Dunfermline Athletic on a two-year contract. He signed for the club at the same time as his brother Louis. After one season with Dunfermline, he signed a two-year contract with EFL League Two club Bradford City for an undisclosed fee. He moved on loan to Torquay United in January 2020.

On 19 January 2021, Longridge left Bradford City by mutual consent, and returned to Livingston. Longridge was loaned to Cove Rangers in March 2023.

Career statistics

Honours
Livingston
Scottish League One: 2016–17

References

External links

1995 births
Living people
Scottish footballers
Association football defenders
Ayr United F.C. players
Stranraer F.C. players
Livingston F.C. players
Dunfermline Athletic F.C. players
Bradford City A.F.C. players
Torquay United F.C. players
Scottish Football League players
Scottish Professional Football League players
English Football League players
National League (English football) players
Cove Rangers F.C. players